Zachariassen is a surname. Notable people with the surname include:

Aksel Zachariassen (1898–1987), Norwegian politician, newspaper editor, secretary and writer
Allan Zachariassen (born 1955), Danish long-distance runner
Anders Zachariassen (born 1991), Danish handball player
Kristoffer Zachariassen (born January 27, 1994), Norwegian soccer player.
Andreas J. Zachariassen, founder of Hamburg-based SCHIFFAHRTSGESELLSCHAFT MBH & CO. KG

See also
Fredrik Zachariasen (1931–1999), American physicist
William Houlder Zachariasen (1906–1979), Norwegian-American physicist

References